Fortress Forever is a multiplayer first-person shooter total conversion modification for Half-Life 2. The game is based on Team Fortress Classic, and has been created by the Fortress Forever development team. The intended scope of Fortress Forever is to please older Team Fortress Classic fans, while at the same time creating a game enjoyable enough to players new to Team Fortress styled games.

Development 
Fortress Forever was in development (planning phase) for more than a year before the Half-Life 2 SDK was released, according to a developer team member. Fortress Forever was originally released as a modification for Half-Life 2 on September 13, 2007, where anyone who owned a copy of the game could play the modification. The game is now freely available to all who have a Steam account.
On May 24, 2013, Fortress Forever updated to version 2.46. Version 2.46 incorporated an auto-updater for future client updates.
On October 16, 2013, FF was 'greenlit' on Steam Greenlight, meaning the game would be coming to Steam soon. Version 2.46 was the last version of Fortress Forever released before the game and future updates released on Steam.

On March 20, 2015, it was announced that Fortress Forever would be released for download on Steam on March 27, 2015 and they did release as planned with version 2.5.

On June 5, 2016, the latest version, version 2.6 was released. This was also the first major update (the first update with a version number) since the Steam release.

Reception
Fortress Forever had a very successful launch but only one month later, Team Fortress 2 was released. It began to lose many players and was considered dead until the Steam re-release in 2015.

References

External links
 Official website

2007 video games
First-person shooters
Source (game engine) mods
Multiplayer online games
Windows games
Windows-only games
Lua (programming language)-scripted video games